Yarragrin, New South Wales is a locality and civil parish of Warrumbungle Shire in New South Wales, Australia.

The parish was named for Yarragrin Run established in the 19th century.

References

Localities in New South Wales